Kathy Tyler is an American politician and a Democratic member of the South Dakota House of Representatives representing District 4 since January 11, 2013.

Elections
2012 When District 4 incumbent Representative Republican Valentine Rausch was term limited and ran for South Dakota Senate and Democrat Steve Street was term limited and retired, leaving both District 4 seats open, James R. Peterson and Tyler were unopposed for the June 5, 2012 Democratic primary; in the four-way November 6, 2012 general election, Tyler took the first seat with 5,131 votes (26.71%) and fellow Democratic nominee Peterson took the second seat ahead of Republican nominees Fred Deutsch and James Gilkerson, who had run for the seat in 2008 and 2010.

References

External links
Official page at the South Dakota Legislature
 

Place of birth missing (living people)
Year of birth missing (living people)
Living people
Democratic Party members of the South Dakota House of Representatives
People from Grant County, South Dakota
Women state legislators in South Dakota
21st-century American politicians
21st-century American women politicians